Imre Bacskai (born 21 June 1961) is a Hungarian boxer. He competed in the men's light welterweight event at the 1980 Summer Olympics and in the men's welterweight event at the 1988 Summer Olympics.

References

External links
 

1961 births
Living people
Hungarian male boxers
Olympic boxers of Hungary
Boxers at the 1980 Summer Olympics
Boxers at the 1988 Summer Olympics
Martial artists from Budapest
Welterweight boxers